The women's heptathlon event at the 2003 European Athletics U23 Championships was held in Bydgoszcz, Poland, at Zawisza Stadion on 17 and 18 July.

Medalists

Results

Final
17-18 July

Participation
According to an unofficial count, 12 athletes from 9 countries participated in the event.

 (1)
 (1)
 (2)
 (2)
 (1)
 (2)
 (1)
 (1)
 (1)

References

Heptathlon
Combined events at the European Athletics U23 Championships